Seitajärvi (seita: a Sami sacred place + järvi: lake) was a community located in the Savukoski municipality of Finland.

In 1940 the Seitajärvi community included five farming and reindeer enterprises.

On July 7, 1944, Seitajärvi suffered a devastating attack (fi) by Soviet partisans.

Many families of this community relocated to Kittilä in northwest Lapland and nowadays the Seitajärvi people have no standing settlements.

See also 
 Military history of Finland during World War II
 Soviet war crimes#Finland
 The Cuckoo (film), set in World War II Lapland

Former populated places in Finland
Savukoski
Geography of Lapland (Finland)